Juan Mónaco was the defending champion, but lost in the first round to Dustin Brown.

Steve Johnson won the title, defeating Thomaz Bellucci in the final, 6–4, 4–6, 7–6(7–5).

Seeds
The top four seeds receive a bye into the second round.

Draw

Finals

Top half

Bottom half

Qualifying

Seeds

Qualifiers

Qualifying draw

First qualifier

Second qualifier

Third qualifier

Fourth qualifier

References
Main Draw
Qualifying Draw

Singles